Connexins (Cx) (TC# 1.A.24), or gap junction proteins, are structurally related transmembrane proteins that assemble to form vertebrate gap junctions. An entirely different family of proteins, the innexins, form gap junctions in invertebrates. Each gap junction is composed of two hemichannels, or connexons, which consist of homo- or heterohexameric arrays of connexins, and the connexon in one plasma membrane docks end-to-end with a connexon in the membrane of a closely opposed cell. The hemichannel is made of six connexin subunits, each of which consist of four transmembrane segments. Gap junctions are essential for many physiological processes, such as the coordinated depolarization of cardiac muscle, proper embryonic development, and the conducted response in microvasculature. Connexins also have non-channel dependant functions relating to cytoskeleton and cell migration. For these reasons, mutations in connexin-encoding genes can lead to functional and developmental abnormalities.

Nomenclature
Connexins are commonly named according to their molecular weights, e.g. Cx26 is the connexin protein of 26 kDa. A competing nomenclature is the gap junction protein system, where connexins are sorted by their α (GJA) and β (GJB) forms, with additional connexins grouped into the C, D and E groupings, followed by an identifying number, e.g. GJA1 corresponds to Cx43. Following a vote at the Gap Junction Conference (2007) in Elsinore the community agreed to use the GJ nomenclature system for the genes that encode connexins, but wished to retain the connexin nomenclature for the encoded proteins using the weight of the human protein for the numbering of orthologous proteins.

Structure

Connexins contain four highly ordered transmembrane segments (TMSs), primarily unstructured C and N cytoplasmic termini, a cytoplasmic loop (CL) and two extra-cellular loops, (EL-1) and (EL-2). Connexins are assembled in groups of six to form hemichannels, or connexons, and two hemichannels then combine to form a gap junction.

The crystal structure of the gap junction channel formed by human Cx26 (also known as GJB2) at 3.5 Å resolution is available. The density map showed the two membrane-spanning hemichannels and the arrangement of the four TMSs of the six protomers forming each hemichannel. The hemichannels feature a positively charged cytoplasmic entrance, a funnel, a negatively charged transmembrane pathway, and an extracellular cavity. The pore is narrowed at the funnel, which is formed by the six amino-terminal helices lining the wall of the channel, which thus determines the molecular size restriction at the channel entrance.

The connexin gene family is diverse, with twenty-one identified members in the sequenced human genome, and twenty in the mouse (nineteen of which are orthologous pairs). They usually weigh between 25 and 60 kDa, and have an average length of 380 amino acids. The various connexins have been observed to combine into both homomeric and heteromeric gap junctions, each of which may exhibit different functional properties including pore conductance, size selectivity, charge selectivity, voltage gating, and chemical gating.

Biosynthesis and internalization
A remarkable aspect of connexins is that they have a relatively short half life of only a few hours. The result is the presence of a dynamic cycle by which connexins are synthesized and replaced. It has been suggested that this short life span allows for more finely regulated physiological processes to take place, such as in the myometrium.

From the nucleus to the membrane
As they are being translated by ribosomes, connexins are inserted into the membrane of the endoplasmic reticulum (ER). It is in the ER that connexins are properly folded, yielding two extracellular loops, EL-1 and EL-2. It is also in the ER that the oligomerization of connexin molecules into hemichannels begins, a process which may continue in the UR-Golgi intermediate compartment as well. The arrangements of these hemichannels can be homotypic, heterotypic, and combined heterotypic/heteromeric. After exiting the ER and passing through the ERGIC, the folded connexins will usually enter the cis-Golgi network. However, some connexins, such as Cx26 may be transported independent of the Golgi.

Gap junction assembly
After being inserted into the plasma membrane of the cell, the hemichannels freely diffuse within the lipid bilayer. Through the aid of specific proteins, mainly cadherins, the hemichannels are able to dock with hemichannels of adjacent cells forming gap junctions. Recent studies have shown the existence of communication between adherens junctions and gap junctions, suggesting a higher level of coordination than previously thought.

Function
Connexin gap junctions are found only in vertebrates, while a functionally analogous (but genetically unrelated) group of proteins, the innexins, are responsible for gap junctions in invertebrate species. Innexin orthologs have also been identified in Chordates, but they are no longer capable of forming gap junctions. Instead, the channels formed by these proteins (called pannexins) act as very large transmembrane pores that connect the intra- and extracellular compartments.

Within the CNS, gap junctions provide electrical coupling between progenitor cells, neurons, and glial cells. By using specific connexin knockout mice, studies revealed that cell coupling is essential for visual signaling. In the retina, ambient light levels influence cell coupling provided by gap junction channels, adapting the visual function for various lighting conditions. Cell coupling is governed by several mechanisms, including connexin expression.

Decrock et al.. have discussed a multilevel platform via which connexins and pannexins can influence the following cellular functions within a tissue: (1) connexin gap junctional channels (GJCs) enable direct cell-cell communication of small molecules, (2) connexin hemichannels and pannexin channels can contribute to autocrine/paracrine signaling pathways, and (3) different structural domains of these proteins allow for channel-independent functions, such as cell-cell adhesion, interactions with the cytoskeleton, and the activation of intracellular signaling pathways. Thus, connexins and pannexins have multifaceted contributions to brain development and specific processes in the neuro-glio-vascular unit, including synaptic transmission and plasticity, glial signaling, vasomotor control, cell movement, and blood-brain barrier integrity in the mature CNS.

Substrate specificity
Different connexins may exhibit differing specificities for solutes. For example, adenosine passed about 12-fold better through channels formed by Cx32 while AMP and ADP passed about 8-fold better, and ATP greater than 300-fold better, through channels formed by Cx43. Thus, addition of phosphate to adenosine appears to shift its relative permeability from channels formed by Cx32 to channels formed by Cx43. This may have functional consequence because the energy status of a cell could be controlled via connexin expression and channel formation.

Transport reaction
The transport reaction catalyzed by connexin gap junctions is:
Small molecules (cell 1 cytoplasm) ⇌ small molecules (cell 2 cytoplasm)

Human connexins and clinical significance

Gap junctions are essential for many physiological processes, such as the coordinated depolarization of cardiac muscle, proper embryonic development, and the conducted response in microvasculature. For this reason, deletion or mutation of the various connexin isoforms produces distinctive phenotypes and pathologies. While mutations in Cx43 are mostly linked to oculodentodigital dysplasia, Cx47 mutations are associated with Pelizaeus-Merzbacher-like disease and lymphedema. Cx40 mutations are principally linked to atrial fibrillation. Mutations in Cx37 have not yet been described, but polymorphisms in the Cx37 gene have been implicated in the development of arterial disease.

References

Sources

External links
 
 

Protein families
Membrane proteins
Transmembrane proteins
Transmembrane transporters
Transport proteins
Integral membrane proteins